"Need You Now (How Many Times)" is a song by Christian contemporary Christian musician Plumb from her sixth studio album, Need You Now. It was released on July 17, 2012, as the second single from the album.

Composition 
"Need You Now (How Many Times)" was written by Tiffany Arbuckle Lee, Luke Harry Walker Sheets and Christa Nichole Wells.

Release 
The song "Need You Now (How Many Times)" was digitally released as the second single from Need You Now on July 17, 2012.

Track listing 
Remix EP
 Need You Now (How Many Times) (Swedish Xian Revolution Dubstep Mix) 3:54
 Cut (Slovak Dubstep Mix) 4:42
 Need You Now (How Many Times) (Swedish Xian Revolution Electro Mix) 4:49
 Beautiful History (Dave Aude Radio Edit) 4:17
 Beautiful History (Almighty Radio Edit) 3:47
 Beautiful History (Scotty K Radio Edit) 4:35
 Beautiful History (Ian Neiman Club Mix) 7:41
 Beautiful History (Dave Aude Club Mix) 8:06
 Beautiful History (Almighty Club Mix) 6:37
 Beautiful History (Scotty K Club Mix) 8:03

The Remixes
 Need You Now (How Many Times) (Dave Aude Radio Edit) 3:43
 Need You Now (How Many Times) (Dohr & Mongold vs Stefan Dabuck Radio Edit) 3:12
 Need You Now (How Many Times) (Redtop Radio Edit) 3:29
 Need You Now (How Many Times) (Wawa Radio Edit) 3:46
 Need You Now (How Many Times) (J-C Radio Edit) 3:34
 Need You Now (How Many Times) (Dave Aude Club Mix) 7:09
 Need You Now (How Many Times) (Dohr & Mongold vs Stefan Dabuck Remix) 5:40
 Need You Now (How Many Times) (Redtop Club Mix) 6:50
 Need You Now (How Many Times) (Wawa Club Mix) 7:13
 Need You Now (How Many Times) (J-C Club Mix) 6:58
 Need You Now (How Many Times) (Acoustic Live Version) 4:12

Charts

Weekly charts

Year-end charts

References 

2012 singles
Plumb (singer) songs
Songs written by Plumb (singer)
2011 songs
Curb Records singles